Brigadier John James Hope Simpson,  (10 October 1927 – 7 March 2007) was a British Army officer who served as Director SAS from 1972 to 1975.

Military career
Educated at Queen's Royal College in Trinidad, Simpson enlisted in the Coldstream Guards in May 1945 and was commissioned into the Gordon Highlanders in 1946. He served in Malaya during the Malayan Emergency in the early 1950s, in Cyprus during terrorist campaign EOKA in the late 1950s and then commanded a small amphibious team in Borneo during the Indonesia–Malaysia confrontation in the early 1960s. He was appointed an instructor at the Staff College, Camberley in 1965, Commander of the Royal Brunei Armed Forces in 1969 and Director SAS in 1972. His last appointment was in 1975 as director of the team at the Defence Policy Staff who had responsibility for NATO and Europe before he retired in 1979.

References

1927 births
2007 deaths
Alumni of Queen's Royal College, Trinidad
British Army personnel of the Malayan Emergency
British military personnel of the Cyprus Emergency
British military personnel of the Indonesia–Malaysia confrontation
Commanders of the Order of the British Empire
Gordon Highlanders officers
Special Air Service officers
British Army brigadiers
Academics of the Staff College, Camberley